Michael Seitz (born March 29, 1959) is an American retired professional wrestler and former musician. Seitz is best known for leading The Fabulous Freebirds under the ring name Michael "P.S." ("Purely Sexy") Hayes and for his role as an announcer under the name "Handsome" Dok Hendrix in the World Wrestling Federation (WWF). He is currently employed with WWE as Vice President, Creative Writing & Booking and is also a senior producer.

Professional wrestling career

Early career (1977–1982)
Hayes started wrestling in 1977 in the Tennessee regional promotions. In 1978, he wrestled his first tour overseas in Germany for Catch Wrestling Association. In 1979, wrestling for Mid South Wrestling at the suggestion of Bill Watts he formed a tag team with Terry "Bam Bam" Gordy winning the Mid South Tag Team Championship 3 times and became the wrestling faction called The Fabulous Freebirds. Hayes became Michael "P.S." Hayes, and they strutted their way to many tag team titles along with Buddy "Jack" Roberts. Hayes also started moonwalking in the ring like Michael Jackson used to do at his concerts. The Freebirds spent 1980 through 1982 in the NWA's Georgia Championship Wrestling area, where they won the NWA National Tag Team Championship a few times, split and feuded, then mended fences.

World Class Championship Wrestling (1982–1986)
In 1982, they left for World Class Championship Wrestling (WCCW), where they had one of their most famous feuds. Hayes was chosen by the fans to be the special guest referee during the Ric Flair-Kerry Von Erich NWA World Heavyweight Championship steel cage match at Christmas Star Wars. Hayes at one point knocked Flair out so Von Erich could get the pin and the title. Von Erich refused to pin him after the dirty deed which ultimately led to Gordy slamming the cage door on Von Erich's head. As this later cost him the title, it triggered the legendary feud between The Fabulous Freebirds and The Von Erichs and ended a good respectful friendship between both groups. The Freebird-Von Erich feud ended for good in 1993 during a memorial card in tribute to Kerry Von Erich. Hayes was always the leader of the group with his exceptional mic skills and he recorded the team's new theme song, Badstreet USA, in 1983. The video to the song features all three of The Fabulous Freebirds as well as Jimmy Garvin, who was often considered the fourth Freebird. They had used the Lynyrd Skynyrd song "Free Bird" and Willie Nelson's version of "Georgia on My Mind" up to that point and would on occasion in the future.

In 1984, The Freebirds had a brief stint in the WWF but left when management wanted to split them up. The Freebirds then spent a few months in the AWA in 1985, feuding with The Road Warriors over the AWA World Tag Team Championship, winning the belts temporarily at the inaugural SuperClash event before the AWA overturned the decision. The Freebirds interfered in the match where the Warriors lost the belts to Jimmy Garvin and Steve Regal, and subsequently returned to Texas. In 1986, Hayes appeared in the opening credits of Highlander alongside The Fabulous Freebirds, working his Purely Sexy gimmick on the turnbuckle while writhing free of his ring robe.

Universal Wrestling Federation/Jim Crockett Promotions (1986–1988)
The Freebirds also spent several months in the Universal Wrestling Federation in 1986 and early 1987 with Sunshine as their manager. There they feuded with The Fantastics (Bobby Fulton and Tommy Rogers) and with "Dr. Death" Steve Williams. In 1986, Hayes' partner in the Freebirds, Terry Gordy, became the first holder of the UWF heavyweight title. After losing the title by default to One Man Gang, the Freebirds engaged in a major heel vs heel feud with Skandor Akbar's Devastation Inc. group. The feud continued even after Akbar double-crossed Gang and helped Big Bubba Rogers win the title from him, and saw the Freebirds form an alliance with their former enemy Williams against Devastation Inc.

After the breakup of the Freebirds, Hayes became a full-fledged babyface and remained in the UWF, which was later sold to Jim Crockett Promotions (JCP) on April 9, 1987. At the JCP/UWF co-promoted pay-per-view event Starrcade '87, Hayes teamed with Jimmy Garvin (also now a babyface after reconciling with kayfabe brother Ron Garvin) and Sting to face the team of Eddie Gilbert, Rick Steiner and Larry Zbyszko whom they wrestled to a time-limit draw. He later challenged NWA World Champion Ric Flair and frequently teamed with Jimmy Garvin.

Return to WCCW (1988)
Hayes returned to World Class Championship Wrestling to find that his former Freebird partners Gordy and Roberts, in alliance with Iceman Parsons and The Angel of Death, had resumed their feud with the Von Erichs. After Gordy and Roberts helped Parsons win the World Class heavyweight title from Kerry Von Erich by bashing Kerry with socks loaded with weights while the arena lights were mysteriously turned off, a disgusted Hayes allied himself with the Von Erichs against his former Freebird 'brothers'. At the 1988 Parade of Champions, Gordy defeated Hayes in a hair vs hair "triple dome of terror" (three vertically stacked cages) match. After the match, however, Gordy refused to cut Hayes' hair and instead turned babyface on Roberts and cut his hair. Subsequently, Hayes and Gordy reunited as babyfaces and feuded with Roberts and his Samoan Swat Team as well as old Freebird enemies Devastation Inc, of whom Parsons was now a member.

While all this was going on, Hayes continued with his music career, often playing concerts with his Badstreet Band at the Dallas Sportatorium, World Class's main arena. Inevitably, the music career overlapped with World Class' storylines when, at one such concert, Roberts appeared onstage and hit Hayes over the head with a guitar. Hayes also formed a new tag team with "Do It To It" Steve Cox and together they twice briefly beat the Samoan Swat Team for the World Class tag team titles, on September 12–16, 1988 and October 15–17, 1988.

World Championship Wrestling (1989–1994)
In 1989, Hayes went to World Championship Wrestling (WCW) (formerly JCP) where he wrestled as a face. He turned on U.S. Champ Lex Luger during a match with Hiro Matsuda's "Yamazaki Corporation" and joined them. The stable included Ric Flair, Barry and Kendall Windham, and Butch Reed. Hayes feuded with Luger and won the U.S. Title from him after Terry Gordy surprised everybody and interfered in the match. Luger later regained the title from Hayes and The Freebirds entered the tournament to crown new NWA World tag team champions. At Clash of the Champions VII, on June 14, 1989, Jimmy Garvin showed up as the newest Freebird and he and Hayes won the tournament and titles (thus reuniting their old tag team from JCP circa 1987). The new champions immediately feuded with The Midnight Express (Bobby Eaton and Stan Lane). Gordy left in late 1989 and Hayes and Garvin feuded with The Rock 'n' Roll Express (Ricky Morton and Robert Gibson).

In 1991, The Freebirds feuded with "The Young Pistols" (Steve Armstrong and Tracy Smothers). They soon added another Freebird, the masked Badstreet. He helped them win the U.S. Tag Team Titles and they all won the Six-Man Titles. They also had two managers briefly, Big Daddy Dink and Diamond Dallas Page. Once Badstreet departed from the group in late 1991, The Freebirds were left with no real direction. The Freebirds turned face, and Garvin's wife Precious became their on-screen manager. Although they won the U.S. Tag Titles again, The Freebirds disbanded by late 1992. Hayes then turned heel again and started managing Arn Anderson and Bobby Eaton, who were still members of the Dangerous Alliance. He became a member of sorts and even helped Paul E. Dangerously in his feud with Madusa. In 1993, Hayes became a fan favorite again and feuded with Paul Orndorff over the TV Title and then briefly teamed (and later feuded) with Johnny B. Badd and also did some commentating before quitting WCW in January 1994, after being offered a $75,000 a year contract (Hayes would make one final appearance in WCW at SuperBrawl IV in February).

Return to Dallas (1994–1995)
He went back to Dallas to the Global Wrestling Federation and reunited with Garvin and Gordy as The Freebirds, whom he managed them to win their Tag Team Championship, before the company folded that September. After the GWF folded, Hayes remained in Dallas for the National Wrestling Alliance's stay in Dallas, which lasted until April 1995.

World Wrestling Federation/Entertainment/WWE (1995–present)

Dok Hendrix (1995–1999)
Michael Hayes received a tryout match with the WWF on February 21, 1995 at a WWF Superstars taping in Augusta, Georgia. Wrestling in a dark match, Hayes competed as a face and defeated Ken Raper. However he retired from active competition due to a serious back injury he suffered while in WCW and after the NWA's Dallas promotion ended, and debuted on April 14 instead as Dok Hendrix, WWF Action Zone co-host with Todd Pettengill. As Dok Hendrix, he interviewed wrestlers before their matches and initially acted more like a heel, though that was later dropped. His most famous interviews include "The birth of Austin 3:16," "The Super Soaker DX" commercials, and hosting most of WWF's products. Hayes also worked as a color commentator in 1995 with Vince McMahon on WWF Superstars and on the In Your House 1 and the 1995 King of the Ring pay-per-view events and replaced Jerry Lawler for the last two matches at SummerSlam 1995.

Managing The Hardy Boyz (1999)
Hayes returned to active competition in 1999 for Power Pro Wrestling, where he won the promotion's title. He soon came back to WWF TV as the manager for The Hardy Boyz (Matt and Jeff Hardy). The Hardy Boyz lost the Tag Team Titles to The Acolytes at Fully Loaded when Hayes was pinned in a handicap match; he was fired by them in August.

Backstage roles (1999–present)
He then became a backstage road agent (producer) and color commentator for the WWF. Initially appearing for one night on the September 23, 1999 broadcast of SmackDown!, Hayes became a color commentator on Sunday Night Heat alongside Michael Cole and Kevin Kelly from 2000 to 2001, although he was mostly used on the international broadcasts of that show. At WrestleMania X-Seven on April 1, 2001, he competed in the gimmick Battle Royal, but was eliminated by the One Man Gang. During the December 5, 2005 episode of RAW, he became involved in verbal sparring with Edge in which Hayes attacked Edge's lack of main event experience and the details of his love life (with regard to Matt Hardy and Lita). Hayes was later attacked by Edge.

In October 2006, Hayes became the head creative writer for the SmackDown brand after Alex Greenfield's departure from the company. He can be seen on the second season of WWE Classics on Demand series Legends of Wrestling. Hayes made occasional appearances on WWE programmes: on the December 7, 2007 episode of SmackDown, Hayes was a guest of MVP's VIP Lounge. Hayes promoted the new Triumph and Tragedy of WCCW DVD and reinforced its anti-drug message. However, Hayes ended up being attacked by MVP before being saved by Rey Mysterio, Jr. On the June 28, 2010 episode of Raw, Hayes was one of several Legends who accompanied Ricky "The Dragon" Steamboat, who was out to promote his new DVD. Hayes and the other legends were later attacked by the NXT season 1 graduates, collectively known as The Nexus. On the May 12, 2011 episode of WWE Superstars, Hayes accompanied Tyson Kidd to the ring but turned on him a week later after Kidd lost his match to Yoshi Tatsu. Hayes hit Kidd, stating he had better things to do than hang around losers.

In October 2013, Hayes took a leave of absence from WWE for personal reasons, but he returned to work on December 2, 2013. On August 1, 2014 Hayes appeared in a short segment on the online series JBL and Cole Show in which he stared at a "Free Birds, call to enquire" flier. In February 2015, Hayes partook in a WWE.com interview alongside Arn Anderson with Michael Cole to discuss Triple H and Sting's match at WrestleMania 31. On April 2, 2016, Hayes was inducted into the WWE Hall of Fame with the Fabulous Freebirds. Hayes accepted the award alongside Jimmy Garvin.

Music career
In 1987, on the back of the popularity of the "Badstreet USA" theme, Hayes recorded and released an album, Off The Streets. He also performed live concerts to promote the album with his backing band, the Badstreet Band. The July 1988 issue of Pro Wrestling Illustrated (written circa March 1988) contained a (possibly kayfabed) column by writer Dave Rosenbaum in which he visited the box office for a Badstreet Band show and surveyed what sort of people would actually go to Hayes' concerts. In 1992, Hayes performed a duet with music producer Darwin Conort called "Freebird Forever" on the WCW album, Slam Jam 1. In 2011, Hayes paid tribute to his Freebird brother Terry Gordy, who died of a heart attack caused by a blood clot in 2001, with a song entitled "Freebird Road" produced with Darwin Conort, based on Johnny VanZant's "Brickyard Road" (with permission). His music video was an emotional and stirring trip down memory lane as a Freebird and shows shots of him at Gordy's grave.

Championships and accomplishments
Cauliflower Alley Club
Lou Thesz Award (2014)
Georgia Championship Wrestling
NWA Georgia Tag Team Championship (1 time) – with Terry Gordy
NWA National Tag Team Championship (4 times) – with Terry Gordy (3) and Otis Sistrunk (1)
NWA United National Championship (1 time)
Mid-South Wrestling Association
Mid-South Tag Team Championship (2 time) – with Terry Gordy
NWA Mid-America
NWA Mid-America Tag Team Championship (2 times) – with Terry Gordy
Power Pro Wrestling
PPW Heavyweight Championship (1 time)
Professional Wrestling Hall of Fame
Class of 2015 as a member of The Fabulous Freebirds
Pro Wrestling Illustrated
PWI Tag Team of the Year award in 1981 – with Terry Gordy
PWI ranked him #56 of the top 500 singles wrestlers in the PWI 500 in 1992
PWI ranked him #71 of the top 500 singles wrestlers of the "PWI Years" in 2003
PWI ranked him #3 of the top 100 tag teams of the "PWI Years" with Terry Gordy in 2003
World Championship Wrestling
NWA United States Heavyweight Championship (1 time)
NWA (Mid-Atlantic)/WCW World Tag Team Championship (2 times) – with Jimmy Garvin
WCW United States Tag Team Championship (2 times) – with Jimmy Garvin
WCW World Six-Man Tag Team Championship (1 time) – with Jimmy Garvin and Badstreet
World Class Championship Wrestling / World Class Wrestling Association
NWA American Tag Team Championship (1 time) – with Terry Gordy
NWA (Texas)/WCWA World Six-Man Tag Team Championship (7 times) – with Terry Gordy & Buddy Roberts (6 times) and Kerry Von Erich & Kevin Von Erich (1)
WCWA World Tag Team Championship (2 times) – with Steve Cox

 WWE
 WWE Hall of Fame (Class of 2016) as a member of The Fabulous Freebirds
Wrestling Observer Newsletter
Most Charismatic (1981)
Best Three-Man Team (1984) with Terry Gordy & Buddy Roberts
Best Heel (1983,1986)
Feud of the Year (1983, 1984) with Buddy Roberts and Terry Gordy vs. the Von Erichs
Match of the Year (1984) with Buddy Roberts and Terry Gordy vs. the Von Erichs (Kerry, Kevin, and Mike) in an Anything Goes match on July 4
Best Color Commentator (1986)
Wrestling Observer Newsletter Hall of Fame (Class of 2005) – as part of The Fabulous Freebirds

Discography

Single
Badstreet USA Grand Theft Records 1984

Album
Off The Streets – Grand Theft Records 1987
Track list:
 "Everything Is Alright" (4:00)
 "When The Love Comes Down" (3:55)
 "The Night You Can't Remember" (4:14)
 "Ain't Superstitious" (3:46)
 "Touch My Level" (3:32)
 "I Gotta Have It" (3:35)
 "The Boys Are Back In Town" (4:49)
 "You Made Me The Way I Am" (4:49)
 "Blue Jean Queen" (5:25)
 "Heartbeat Away" (4:42)
 "Badstreet USA" (4:21)

References

External links

 Accelerator Profile

1959 births
21st-century American composers
21st-century American male musicians
American color commentators
American male composers
American male professional wrestlers
American male television writers
American television writers
Living people
NWA/WCW/WWE United States Heavyweight Champions
Professional wrestlers from Florida
Professional wrestlers from Georgia (U.S. state)
Professional wrestling announcers
Professional Wrestling Hall of Fame and Museum
Professional wrestling managers and valets
Professional wrestling trainers
Professional wrestling writers
Screenwriters from Florida
Screenwriters from Georgia (U.S. state)
Sportspeople from Marietta, Georgia
Sportspeople from Pensacola, Florida
The Dangerous Alliance members
The Four Horsemen (professional wrestling) members
WWE executives
WWE Hall of Fame inductees
20th-century professional wrestlers
NWA United National Champions
WCW World Tag Team Champions
NWA/WCW United States Tag Team Champions
NWA Georgia Tag Team Champions
NWA National Tag Team Champions